Illtal is a commune in the Haut-Rhin department of northeastern France. The municipality was established on 1 January 2016 and consists of the former communes of Oberdorf, Grentzingen and Henflingen. It takes its name from the valley of the river Ill.

See also 
Communes of the Haut-Rhin department

References 

Communes of Haut-Rhin